This list of lobe-finned fish is a comprehensive listing of all genera that have ever been included in the class Sarcopterygii, excluding purely vernacular terms and Tetrapods. The list includes all commonly accepted genera, but also genera that are now considered invalid, doubtful (nomen dubium), or were not formally published (nomen nudum), as well as junior synonyms.

Extant genera are bolded. All non-bolded genera are extinct.

Scope and terminology
There is no official, canonical list of lobe-finned fish genera.

Authors and Year
The authors column lists the authors of the formal description responsible for the erection of the genus listed. They are not necessarily the same as the authors of the type species as sometimes a species from one genus is determined sufficiently distinct to warrant the erection of a new genus to house it. If this is the case, only the latter authors will be listed. The year column notes the year the description was published.

Status
Naming conventions and terminology follow the International Code of Zoological Nomenclature. Technical terms used include:

 Junior synonym: A name which describes the same taxon as a previously published name. If two or more genera are formally designated and the type specimens are later assigned to the same genus, the first to be published (in chronological order) is the senior synonym, and all other instances are junior synonyms. Senior synonyms are generally used, except by special decision of the ICZN, but junior synonyms cannot be used again, even if deprecated. Junior synonymy is often subjective, unless the genera described were both based on the same type specimen.
 Nomen nudum (Latin for "naked name"): A name that has appeared in print but has not yet been formally published by the standards of the ICZN. Nomina nuda (the plural form) are invalid, and are therefore not italicized as a proper generic name would be. If the name is later formally published, that name is no longer a nomen nudum and will be italicized on this list. Often, the formally published name will differ from any nomina nuda that describe the same specimen.
 Preoccupied name: A name that is formally published, but which has already been used for another taxon. This second use is invalid (as are all subsequent uses) and the name must be replaced. As preoccupied names are not valid generic names, they will also go unitalicized on this list.
 Nomen dubium (Latin for "dubious name"): A name describing a fossil with no unique diagnostic features.

Age
The age column denotes the epoch of geologic time to which the fossils date. The abbreviations are as follows.

 uTri is Upper Triassic
 lJur is Lower Jurassic
 mJur is Middle Jurassic
 uJur is Upper Jurassic
 lCret is Lower Cretaceous
 uCret is Upper Cretaceous

Genera that are invalid, misidentified, or otherwise do not represent a valid sarcopterygian are listed as age N/A because there was never a time in which a sarcopterygian by that generic name actually lived.

Location and Notes
The location column designates the geographic region where remains of the relevant genus have been found. The regions used are continents except in the case of smaller landmasses (e.g. Cuba). Political bodies, being non-existent in the Mesozoic are not used to indicate genera locations. Genera that are invalid, misidentified, or otherwise do not represent a valid sarcopterygian are listed as location N/A because there was never a place in which a sarcopterygian by that generic name actually lived. Extant marine sarcopterygians are listed by ocean. Extant freshwater sarcopterygians are listed by continent. The notes column is a collection of annotations on the scientific significance and taxonomic history of listed genera, as well as elaborations on the information presented in other columns.

A-L

M - Z

See also 

 List of prehistoric bony fish

References 

 http://www.helsinki.fi/~mhaaramo/metazoa/deuterostoma/chordata/sarcopterygii/sarcopterygii_1.html

 List of
Sarcopterygians